Sherif Othman, sometimes written as Sherif Osman, (born 15 September 1982) is an Egyptian Paralympic powerlifter competing in the -56 kg class. Othman has participated in four Summer Paralympic Games winning three gold medals and one silver medal. In the 2008 Summer Paralympics in Beijing he broke the world record with a lift of 202.5 kg. He surpassed his own record when he record a weight of 205 kg at the 2010 IPC Powerlifting World Championship. Then he surpassed his own record again of 205 kg when he record a weight of 211 kg at 2016 Summer Paralympics Games (Rio 2016) winning another gold medal.

In 2021, he won the gold medal in his event at the 2021 World Para Powerlifting Championships held in Tbilisi, Georgia.

References

External links
 

Egyptian powerlifters
Paralympic powerlifters of Egypt
Powerlifters at the 2008 Summer Paralympics
Powerlifters at the 2012 Summer Paralympics
Powerlifters at the 2016 Summer Paralympics
Powerlifters at the 2020 Summer Paralympics
1982 births
Living people
Medalists at the 2008 Summer Paralympics
Medalists at the 2012 Summer Paralympics
Medalists at the 2016 Summer Paralympics
Medalists at the 2020 Summer Paralympics
Paralympic gold medalists for Egypt
African Games gold medalists for Egypt
African Games medalists in weightlifting
Competitors at the 2015 African Games
Paralympic medalists in powerlifting
20th-century Egyptian people
21st-century Egyptian people